Nylon Moon was an Italian dream house production team, formed by Daniele Maffei (aka Daniele Gas) and Michele Generale. Their biggest hit was "Sky Plus", a piano-driven track which was one of the dream house hits during the mid-1990s, reaching #43 in the UK Singles Chart in April 1996. Other singles followed after this, although none reached the same degree of popularity. In October 1996, an album was released entitled, Heartage. Soon after, dream house music lost its popular appeal and Nylon Moon disbanded.

Discography

Albums

Singles

References

External links
Discogs Nylon Moon at Discogs.com

Italian musical duos
Musical groups from Milan